Union Block may refer to:

 Union Block (Mount Pleasant, Iowa)
 Union Block (Fort Scott, Kansas), listed on the NRHP in Bourbon County, Kansas
 Union Block (Oskaloosa, Kansas)
 Union Block (Lewiston, Maine)
 Union Block (Buchanan, Michigan)
 Union Block (Saline, Michigan)
 Union Block (Mayville, North Dakota)
 Union Block (Nunda, New York)
 Union Block (Lima, Ohio)
 Union Block (Newberg, Oregon), listed on the NRHP in Yamhill County, Oregon
 Union Block (Brigham City, Utah)

See also
 Union Block and Montandon Buildings, Boise, Idaho
 Union blockade